Stepanakert Airport, referred to as the Khojaly Airport in Azerbaijan, is an airport in the town of Ivanyan (Khojaly), 10 kilometers north-east of Stepanakert, the regional capital of the de facto Republic of Artsakh, de jure part of Azerbaijan. The airport, in the disputed Nagorno-Karabakh region, has been under the control of the republic since 1992. Flights ceased with the escalation of the First Nagorno-Karabakh War in 1990.

In 2009, the Armenian authorities began the reconstruction of the facilities. Though it was scheduled to launch the first commercial flights on May 9, 2011, NKR officials postponed the new reopening date throughout 2011. In May 2012, the director of the Nagorno-Karabakh Republic Civil Aviation Administration, Tigran Gabrielyan, announced that the airport would begin operations in mid-2012. However the airport remains closed due to security reasons, as the Azerbaijani state has continuously threatened to shoot down flights.

Facilities

History
By the end of 1980 the airport served regular passenger flights from Yerevan to Stepanakert. With the escalation of the Karabakh conflict, the authorities of the Azerbaijan SSR blockaded the Armenian SSR; the Nagorno-Karabakh Autonomous Oblast (or NKAO) airport was the only means of communication with the outside world from the Karabakh region. The airport has been under the control of the Nagorno-Karabakh Republic since the ceasefire agreement of the First Nagorno-Karabakh War in 1994.

Renovation
In 2009, the construction of a new passenger terminal began. Repair work was also conducted on the main runway. According to Nagorno-Karabakh Republic Urban Development Minister Karen Shahramanian, the terminal building would be completed in November 2010; however this was delayed until April 2011.  Air navigation equipment was also installed. The authorities claim that the renovated airport will be capable of receiving 200 passengers every hour.

On April 5, 2011, it was announced that the opening of the airport had been postponed. Dmitry Adbashyan, the head of NKR Civil Aviation Service announced that the airport launch would take place in summer of 2011. NKR officials also insisted that the postponement was not related to the ongoing dispute with Azerbaijan.

Reactions
Shortly after the Nagorno-Karabakh Republic Civil Aviation Department's statement announcing the May 9, 2011 opening date, Arif Mammadov, director of Azerbaijan's Civil Aviation Administration warned that according to aviation laws, flights from Yerevan to Stepanakert are not authorized and may be shot down.

The NKR response came from David Babayan, head of the central information department of the NKR President's office, who said that the Nagorno-Karabakh Defense Army "will give an adequate response" if Azerbaijan attempts to shoot down an aircraft. President of Armenia Serzh Sargsyan condemned the threat to shoot down civilian aircraft, dismissing it as "nonsense". Sargsyan also said that he would be the first passenger of the inaugural Yerevan-Stepanakert flight.

The Azerbaijani presidential administration condemned Sargsyan's statement as a provocation on the part of Armenia. A few days later, Elkhan Polukhov, spokesman for the Azerbaijani Foreign Ministry, declared that “Azerbaijan did not and will not use force against civil facilities.”

The United States Assistant Secretary, Philip Gordon, as well as then ambassadors to Azerbaijan and Armenia, Matthew Bryza and Marie L. Yovanovitch, respectively, characterized Azerbaijan's threat as "unacceptable"; and advised that issues related to the security of the airport should be solved before its opening.

The OSCE Minsk Group, which mediates the conflict, reaffirmed that the operation of this airport could not be used to support any claim of a change in the status of Nagorno-Karabakh, and urged the sides to act in accordance with international law and consistent with current practice for flights over their territory.

The United States ambassador to Azerbaijan Richard Morningstar stated in November 2012 he was "convinced that the functioning of the airport would not help the peace process."

Turkish Foreign Minister Ahmet Davutoğlu, who stated “that such provocative actions will not serve to promote the peaceful settlement of the Karabakh conflict," and called on Armenia "to stop such provocative steps.” The GUAM's Secretary General Valeri Chechelashvili responded by stating that the airport was within the territorial integrity and sovereignty of Azerbaijan and can not operate without Azerbaijan's permission.

On April 14, 2011, 23 members out of 324 from the Parliamentary Assembly of the Council of Europe (PACE) endorsed a declaration condemning "the construction by Armenia of an airport in the occupied Azerbaijani territories."

The Turkish government condemned the efforts of Armenia to open the airport, and reiterated that it will close its air space to Armenia, if the opening goes ahead.

Airlines and destinations
It was expected that the airport would have regular flight services only to Yerevan, Armenia, with state-owned carrier Artsakh Air. Created on January 26, 2011, it intended to purchase three Bombardier CRJ200 jets in 2011. Officials have only stated that a one-way air ticket to the Armenian capital will cost 16,000 drams (US$45). As of December 2021, flights had not started.

See also

 Transport in the Nagorno-Karabakh Republic
 List of airports in Armenia
 List of airports in Azerbaijan
 List of airports in the Republic of Artsakh
 Transport in Armenia
 Transport in Azerbaijan

Notes

External links 

 Stepanakert Airport: How Armenians Hoodwinked Soviet Azerbaijan and Rebuilt Vital Transport Link

 
Airports in Azerbaijan
Nagorno-Karabakh
Buildings and structures in Stepanakert
Airports in the Republic of Artsakh
Military of the Republic of Artsakh
Defunct airports